The Valletta Summit on Migration, also called the Valletta Conference on Migration, was a summit held in Valletta, Malta, on 11–12 November 2015, in which European and African leaders discussed the European migrant crisis. The summit resulted in the EU setting up an Emergency Trust Fund to promote development in Africa, in return for African countries to help out in the crisis.

The summit was held at three venues in Valletta. The opening ceremony was held at Auberge de Castille, while the Mediterranean Conference Centre hosted the main conference. Fort Saint Elmo was used as a media centre. The summit was the largest one ever hosted in Malta, with around 4,000 people attending. The summit was held a few weeks before the Commonwealth Heads of Government Meeting 2015, which was also held in Malta.

Background

The European migrant crisis began when large numbers of migrants and refugees from various countries came to the European Union and applied for asylum. The term "crisis" has been widely used since April 2015, when a number of boats carrying migrants sank in the Mediterranean Sea, resulting in the deaths of around 1,200 people. Following the shipwreck of 19 April, the European Council held a meeting to discuss the situation of migrants in the Mediterranean Sea. Among the decisions made during this meeting, EU leaders agreed to increase dialogue with the African Union and other countries involved in the migrant crisis by holding a summit in Valletta, Malta.

The summit was meant to include leaders of the countries of origin, transit or destination of the migrants. The heads of state and government of EU member states, the African Union Commission, the ECOWAS Commission, and states parties to the Khartoum Process and the Rabat Process were all invited to the summit, as were the Secretary-General of the United Nations and representatives from the International Organization for Migration.

The summit

The Valletta Summit began with an opening ceremony in front of Auberge de Castille, the Office of the Prime Minister of Malta. A monument was unveiled for the occasion. After the ceremony was over, the leaders were transferred to the Mediterranean Conference Centre.

The summit itself began at 6:30 p.m. with a speech by Maltese Prime Minister Joseph Muscat. On the first day, the leaders discussed a situation in which African countries would help to reduce migration across the Mediterranean, with the EU giving Africans better access to Europe in return. According to Muscat, the meeting was "less confrontational than expected".

On 12 November, the European and African leaders signed an agreement to set up an Emergency Trust Fund to help development in African countries as well as to encourage those countries to take back migrants who arrived in Europe. The fund pledged €1.8 billion in aid, with other development assistance of €20 billion every year. The leaders also pledged action to improve the situation in the Horn of Africa, the Sahel, Lake Chad and other parts of Africa to reduce the flow of refugees. They also promised to promote regular migration channels and implement policies for integrating migrants into society.

The summit ended with a Final Declaration and an Action Plan. Donald Tusk, the President of the European Council, said that the migrant crisis was a "race against time" to save the Schengen Agreement.

Aftermath
An informal summit of EU leaders was held just after the Valletta Summit ended. The key points discussed included the threat to the Schengen Area, securing Europe's external border and relations with Turkey.

In July 2016, Minister for Home Affairs and National Security Carmelo Abela announced that the Maltese government is planning a follow-up meeting to the Valletta Summit.

Participants
The leaders who took part in the Valletta Summit are listed in the table below. Sudan was represented by its foreign minister as President Omar al-Bashir could not travel to Malta due to an international arrest warrant. Poland was only represented by an undersecretary of state due to a clash with the first sitting of the country's new parliament.

Monument

A monument commemorating the summit was erected in Valletta's Castille Square, which had just been refurbished. The monument is called The Knot, and it symbolizes unity between Europe and Africa, as well as Malta's geographic position between the two continents. The monument was designed by the artist Vince Briffa, and was carved from Carrara marble.

See also
Commonwealth Heads of Government Meeting 2015

References

External links
Action Plan of the Valletta Summit on Migration

European migrant crisis
Diplomatic conferences in Malta
2015 in Malta
2015 in international relations
21st century in Valletta
21st-century diplomatic conferences
2015 conferences